is a former Japanese football player.

Club statistics

References

External links

j-league

1990 births
Living people
Association football people from Okinawa Prefecture
Japanese footballers
J1 League players
J2 League players
Japan Football League players
Nagoya Grampus players
Ehime FC players
FC Ryukyu players
Association football forwards